Maren Knebel (born 1985) is a German sprint canoer who has competed since the mid-2000s. She won three medals at the ICF Canoe Sprint World Championships with two golds (K-4 200 m and K-4 500 m: both 2007) and a bronze (K-4 1000 m: 2005).

References

German female canoeists
Living people
1985 births
ICF Canoe Sprint World Championships medalists in kayak